Zielnowo may refer to the following villages in Poland:
Zielnowo, Kuyavian-Pomeranian Voivodeship
Zielnowo, Pomeranian Voivodeship
Zielnowo, West Pomeranian Voivodeship